Nueces County is located in the U.S. state of Texas. As of the 2020 census, the population was 353,178, making it the 16th-most populous county in the state. The county seat is Corpus Christi. The county was formed in 1846 from portions of San Patricio County and organized the following year. It is named for the Nueces River, which marks the county's northwestern boundary with San Patricio County before emptying into its mouth at Nueces Bay north of the port of Corpus Christi.
Nueces County is part of the Corpus Christi metropolitan statistical area.

Geography
It borders the Gulf of Mexico.

Major highways

  Interstate 37
  Interstate 69E (Under Construction)
  U.S. Highway 77
  U.S. Highway 181
  State Highway 35
  State Highway 44
  State Highway 286
  State Highway 357
  Farm to Market Road 43
  Farm to Market Road 70
  Farm to Market Road 624
  Farm to Market Road 665
  Farm to Market Road 666

Adjacent counties
 San Patricio County (north)
 Kleberg County (south)
 Jim Wells County (west)
  Aransas County (northeast)

Demographics

Note: the US Census treats Hispanic/Latino as an ethnic category. This table excludes Latinos from the racial categories and assigns them to a separate category. Hispanics/Latinos can be of any race.

As of the census of 2000, 313,645 people, 110,365 households, and 79,683 families resided in the county. The population density was 375 people per square mile (145/km2). The 123,041 housing units averaged 147 per square mile (57/km2). The racial makeup of the county was 72.03% White, 4.24% African American, 0.64% Native American, 1.16% Asian, 0.07% Pacific Islander, 18.74% from other races, and 3.13% from two or more races. About 55.78% of the population was Hispanic or Latino of any race.

Of the 110,365 households, 36.30% had children under the age of 18 living with them, 51.80% were married couples living together, 15.30% had a female householder with no husband present, and 27.80% were not families. About 22.60% of all households were made up of individuals, and 7.90% had someone living alone who was 65 years of age or older. The average household size was 2.79 and the average family size was 3.30.

In the county, the age distribution was 28.40% under the age of 18, 10.50% from 18 to 24, 28.90% from 25 to 44, 21.10% from 45 to 64, and 11.20% who were 65 years of age or older. The median age was 33 years. For every 100 females, there were 95.80 males. For every 100 females age 18 and over, there were 92.50 males.

The median income for a household in the county was $35,959, and for a family was $41,066. Males had a median income of $31,571 versus $22,324 for females. The per capita income for the county was $17,036. About 14.70% of families and 18.20% of the population were below the poverty line, including 24.00% of those under age 18 and 15.80% of those age 65 or over.

Communities

Cities (multiple counties)
 Aransas Pass (partly in San Patricio and Aransas Counties)
 Corpus Christi (county seat) (San Patricio and Aransas Counties)
 Ingleside (mostly in San Patricio County)
 Portland (mostly in San Patricio County)
 San Patricio (mostly in San Patricio County)

Cities

 Agua Dulce
 Bishop
 Driscoll
 Petronila
 Port Aransas
 Robstown

Census-designated places

 Banquete
 La Paloma-Lost Creek
 North San Pedro
 Rancho Banquete
 Sandy Hollow-Escondidas
 Spring Gardens
 Tierra Grande
 Tierra Verde

Unincorporated communities
 Chapman Ranch
 Rabb
 Violet

Education
School districts:
 Agua Dulce Independent School District
 Aransas Pass Independent School District
 Banquete Independent School District
 Bishop Consolidated Independent School District
 Calallen Independent School District
 Driscoll Independent School District
 Flour Bluff Independent School District
 London Independent School District
 Port Aransas Independent School District
 Robstown Independent School District
 Tuloso-Midway Independent School District
 West Oso Independent School District

Del Mar College is the designated community college for all of Nueces County.

Politics

Historically, Nueces County leaned Democratic in presidential elections, though in recent years has narrowly voted Republican. Dwight D. Eisenhower in 1956 became the first Republican candidate to carry the county. Prior to that year, the only times Nueces County did not vote for the national Democratic candidate was in its first presidential election in 1848 for Whig Zachary Taylor, and in 1860, supporting Southern Democratic John C. Breckinridge. Since Eisenhower's election, the only other Republicans to carry the county in the 20th century were Richard Nixon in 1972 and Ronald Reagan in 1984. So far, Bill Clinton remains the last Democratic candidate to win Nueces County, having done so in 1996.

Since 2000, Nueces County has voted for every Republican presidential candidate, with only George W. Bush in 2004 having carried it by a double digit margin, and his 56.8% of the vote is also the highest for any Republican in the county's history. In 2016, Donald Trump defeated Hillary Clinton in the county with a plurality of 48.6% to 47.1%, or 1,568 votes, the closest race since 1956. In 2020, Trump won the county again, albeit this time with a slight majority and 2.9% margin, or 3,692 votes, over Joe Biden.

Democratic strength is concentrated within the inland portion of the county, with particular strengths in downtown Corpus Christi plus the city's heavily Hispanic neighborhoods, Robstown, and communities in the western part of the county. Republicans generally do well with areas closer to the coast, particularly in the southeast suburbs of Corpus Christi, Flour Bluff, and Port Aransas.

See also

 National Register of Historic Places listings in Nueces County, Texas
 Recorded Texas Historic Landmarks in Nueces County
 List of museums in the Texas Gulf Coast

References

External links

 Nueces County government's website
 Nueces County in Handbook of Texas Online at the University of Texas
 Historic Nueces County materials, hosted by the Portal to Texas History.

 
1847 establishments in Texas
Populated places established in 1847
Corpus Christi, Texas
Majority-minority counties in Texas